Jethren Barr (born 13 September 1995 in Pinetown) is a professional football player who plays for Northern Irish side Portadown in the NIFL Premiership. He holds the record as the youngest professional goalkeeper to play in the South African Premier League at just 17 years old. He is nicknamed “Inkosi Yabelungu” by the South African fan base of his home country .

References 

1995 births
Living people
Association football goalkeepers
South African soccer players
Bidvest Wits F.C. players
Stellenbosch F.C. players
Maritzburg United F.C. players
South African Premier Division players
Portadown F.C. players
South African expatriate soccer players
Expatriate association footballers in Northern Ireland
South African expatriate sportspeople in Northern Ireland
Soccer players from Durban